Jerald Joseph Jones (October 9, 1895 – June 2, 1938) was an American football and baseball player and coach.  He played professional football in the first years of the National Football League (NFL), from 1920 to 1924, with the Decatur/Chicago Staleys—now  known as the Chicago Bears, the Rock Island Independents, the Toledo Maroons and the Cleveland Bulldogs. Prior to his professional career, Jones played at college football for the Notre Dame Fighting Irish.  He was also a member of the Great Lakes Navy Bluejackets football team in 1918.

Jone served as line coach for the football team at the University of Missouri in 1921 and was the school's head baseball coach the following spring.  In 1926, he worked at the line coach at St. Xavier College—now known as Xavier University—in Cincinnati.  In 1932, Jones was named the head football, basketball, and track coach at Columbia College—now known as Loras College—in Dubuque, Iowa.  He died on June 2, 1938 at the Mayo Clinic in Rochester, Minnesota.

Head coaching record

Football

References

External links
 
 
 Jerry Jones Bio (Staley Museum)

1895 births
1938 deaths
American football guards
Chicago Staleys players
Cincinnati Bearcats football coaches
Cleveland Bulldogs players
College men's basketball head coaches in the United States
Decatur Staleys players
Great Lakes Navy Bluejackets football players
Loras Duhawks football coaches
Loras Duhawks football players
Loras Duhawks men's basketball coaches
Missouri Tigers baseball coaches
Missouri Tigers football coaches
Notre Dame Fighting Irish football players
Rock Island Independents players
Toledo Maroons players
Xavier Musketeers football coaches
People from Cloud County, Kansas
People from Sapulpa, Oklahoma
Sportspeople from Tulsa, Oklahoma
Coaches of American football from Oklahoma
Players of American football from Oklahoma
Baseball coaches from Oklahoma
Basketball coaches from Oklahoma